The 1957 Yale Bulldogs football team represented Yale University in the 1957 NCAA University Division football season.  The Bulldogs were led by sixth-year head coach Jordan Olivar, played their home games at the Yale Bowl and finished the season with a 6–2–1 record.

Schedule

References

Yale
Yale Bulldogs football seasons
Yale Bulldogs football